Ding Ning was the defending champion but lost in the semifinals to Li Xiaoxia. Ding Ning had won the last two World Tennis Championships, 2011 and 2012. Li went on to win the title by defeating Liu Shiwen 11–8, 4–11, 11–7, 12–10, 6–11, 13–11 in the final.

Seeds
Singles matches were best of 7 games in qualification matches and best of 7 games in the 128-player sized main draw.

  Ding Ning (semifinals)
  Liu Shiwen (final)
  Li Xiaoxia (champion)
  Feng Tianwei (quarterfinals)
  Zhu Yuling (semifinals)
  Shen Yanfei (fourth round)
  Kasumi Ishikawa (third round)
  Wu Yang (quarterfinals)
  Chen Meng (fourth round)
  Ai Fukuhara (first round)
  Jiang Huajun (fourth round)
  Viktoria Pavlovich (second round)
  Seok Ha-Jung (second round)
  Elizabeta Samara (second round)
  Yang Ha-Eun (third round)
  Seo Hyo-Won (fourth round)
  Li Jiao (third round)
  Iveta Vacenovská (second round)
  Liu Jia (fourth round)
  Yu Mengyu (second round)
  Cheng I-ching (second round)
  Wu Jiaduo (third round)
  Sayaka Hirano (third round)
  Lee Ho Ching (third round)
  Matilda Ekholm (third round)
  Daniela Dodean (third round)
  Huang Yi-Hua (third round)
  Ri Myong-Sun (quarterfinals)
  Margaryta Pesotska (third round)
  Kristin Silbereisen (third round)
  Hiroko Fujii (third round)
  Georgina Póta (first round)
  Xian Yi Fang (third round)
  Kim Jong (second round)
  Petrissa Solja (first round)
  Irene Ivancan (second round)
  Chen Szu-yu (second round)
  Misaki Morizono (second round)
  Zhenqi Barthel (third round)
  Ni Xialian (second round)
  Petra Lovas (second round)
  Ri Mi-Gyong (second round)
  Park Young-Sook (second round)
  Natalia Partyka (second round)
  Ng Wing Nam (second round)
  Sara Ramírez (first round)
  Renata Štrbiková (second round)
  Shiho Matsudaira (third round)
  Tetyana Bilenko (fourth round)
  Yana Noskova (first round)
  Krisztina Tóth (second round)
  Lily Zhang (second round)
  Ariel Hsing (first round)
  Szandra Pergel (second round)
  Mie Skov (first round)
  Bernadette Szőcs (first round)
  Melek Hu (quarterfinals)
  Nanthana Komwong (second round)
  Dana Čechová (second round)
  Doo Hoi Kem (second round)
  Anamaria Erdelji (first round)
  Ganna Gaponova (second round)
  Nikoleta Stefanova (second round)
  Polina Mikhailova (second round)

Draw

Finals

Top half

Section 1

Section 2

Section 3

Section 4

Bottom half

Section 5

Section 6

Section 7

Section 8

References

External links
Main Draw

Women's singles
World